Préaux is a commune in the Indre department in central France.

Geography
The village lies on the left bank of the Indrois, which flows northwest through the southern part of the commune and forms part of its western border.

Population

See also
Communes of the Indre department

References

Communes of Indre